UCN may stand for:

National Civic Union (Bolivia), a political party
Ultracold neutrons
Genes in the human urocortin family
UCN (gene)
UCN2
UCN3
UCN, the IATA Airport Code for Buchanan Airport
Ultimate Custom Night, a survival horror video game

Education
Central University of Nicaragua, a private and nonprofit university, Nicaragua
Universidad Católica del Norte, a university in Antofagasta, Chile
University College of the North, a university college in Manitoba, Canada
University College of Northern Denmark, a university in Denmark